Johannes "Jan" Nicolaus Ignacius Keizer (born 6 October 1940 in Volendam, North Holland) is a retired Dutch referee. He is known for having refereed two matches in the 1986 FIFA World Cup in Mexico. He also refereed one match in the 1984 UEFA European Football Championship in France.

Keizer is known to have been a FIFA referee during the period from 1974 to 1987. He officiated the final at the 1984 Olympic tournament between France and Brazil, and served as a referee in the 1983 FIFA World Youth Championship, UEFA Euro 1980 qualifying, UEFA Euro 1984 qualifying, UEFA Euro 1988 qualifying, 1978 FIFA World Cup qualification, 1982 World Cup qualification, and 1986 World Cup qualification.

References

External links
Profile

1940 births
Living people
Dutch football referees
Olympic football referees
FIFA World Cup referees
People from Volendam
1986 FIFA World Cup referees
UEFA Euro 1984 referees
Sportspeople from North Holland